Marcus Wallmark (born August 9, 1991) is a Swedish former professional ice hockey player. He played one game for Skellefteå AIK in the Elitserien during the 2010–11 Elitserien season.

References

External links

1991 births
Living people
Karlskrona HK players
Narvik IK players
Skellefteå AIK players
Sportspeople from Umeå
Swedish ice hockey centres
Visby/Roma HK players